RDS may refer to:

Broadcasting
 Radio Data System, a communications-protocol standard used with commercial FM
 Radio Dimensione Suono, an Italian radio station
 RDS Info, a sister sports news channel to Réseau des sports
 Réseau des sports, a French-language television network in Canada
 RDS, sister station of RTS (TV station)

Companies and organizations
 Research Defence Society, a former British lobby group
 Retained Duty System, used by a Retained Firefighter to distinguish between whole time fire service
 Rough Draft Studios, an animation production studio in Glendale, California
 Royal Dublin Society, for promoting agriculture, arts, industry, and science in Ireland
 Royal Dutch Shell, the former name of Shell plc

Computing
 Amazon Relational Database Service, Amazon's cloud-based Relational Database Service
 Random dot stereogram, a form of 3-D image
 Reliable Datagram Sockets, a computer-networking protocol
 Remote Data Services, a deprecated component of Microsoft Data Access Components
 Remote Desktop Services, Microsoft's mechanism for remote access
 Research Data Services (RDS), part of Australian Research Data Commons
 Romania Data Systems, an ISP in Romania

Science and Medicine
 Rate-determining step, the slowest step of a chemical reaction
 Reflectance difference spectroscopy, a spectroscopic technique
 Relational developmental systems, a psychological metatheory
 Respiratory distress syndrome (disambiguation), a lung disease with two forms
 Respondent-driven sampling, a form of snowball sampling for subject-recruitment and data-collection in survey research
 Reward deficiency syndrome, a term coined by neuroscientist Kenneth Blum

Weaponry
 Nuclear tests in the Soviet atomic bomb project, including a list of tests named RDS
 Red dot sight, a type of firearm reflector sight

Other
 RDS Arena, a stadium within the grounds of the Royal Dublin Society
 Rajolibanda Diversion Scheme, an irrigation project in Mahbubunagar district in Karnataka, India
 Retiree Drug Subsidy, a program offered by the U.S. Centers for Medicare and Medicaid Services
 Reddish South railway station, England has the National Rail station code "RDS"
 Ron DeSantis (born 1978), American politician